White Mice is a 1926 American silent drama film filmed in color with the Kelley Color Process (Wilson-Wetherald Color Process). It was directed by Edward H. Griffith and starring Jacqueline Logan, William Powell, and Ernest Hilliard. It is based upon the novel of the same name by Richard Harding Davis.

Plot

Cast

References

Bibliography
 Goble, Alan. The Complete Index to Literary Sources in Film. Walter de Gruyter, 1999.

External links

1926 films
1926 drama films
Silent American drama films
Films directed by Edward H. Griffith
American silent feature films
1920s English-language films
American black-and-white films
Associated Exhibitors films
1920s American films